Martin Agricola (6 January 1486 – 10 June 1556) was a German composer of Renaissance music and a music theorist.

Biography
Agricola was born in Świebodzin, a town in Western Poland, and took the name Agricola later in life, a common practice among Lutherans often meant to emphasize humble, peasant origins. From 1524 until his death, he lived in the German city of Magdeburg, where he was a teacher or cantor in the Protestant school. Georg Rhau, a publisher and senator in Wittenberg, was Agricola's close friend and publisher. 

Agricola's theoretical writing was valuable in expounding the change from the old to the new system of musical notation. His Musica instrumentalis deudsch (English: German Instrumental Music), published in 1528, 1530, 1532 and 1542, and then heavily revised in 1545, was one of the most important early works in organology and on the elements of music.

Agricola was the first to harmonize in four parts Martin Luther's famous chorale, "Ein feste Burg ist unser Gott" (English: "A Mighty Fortress Is Our God".

Notes

References
Attribution

Further reading
Translation of Musica Instrumentalis Deudsch
Classical Composers Database

1486 births
1556 deaths
Renaissance composers
Classical composers of church music
German classical composers
German male classical composers
German music theorists
Silesian-German people
People from Świebodzin